Bell Coulee Shelter is a prehistoric rock shelter for ancient people, located in Mindoro, Wisconsin, in La Crosse County, Wisconsin.

The Bell Coulee Shelter is a rock art site listed on the National Register of Historic Places.  It contains 
petroglyphs, where a hard object was used to carve or incise a rock surface, and/or pictographs, paintings on the rock using natural pigments.

References

External links
Article about Bell Coulee Shelter and Samuels' Cave, National Speleological Society, Inc. March 2005

Archaeological sites on the National Register of Historic Places in Wisconsin
Geography of La Crosse County, Wisconsin
Native American history of Wisconsin
Rock shelters in the United States
National Register of Historic Places in La Crosse County, Wisconsin